HP may refer to:

Businesses and organisations
 HP Inc., an American technology company
 Hewlett-Packard, the predecessor to HP Inc.
 HP Foods
 HP Sauce, formerly made by HP Foods
 Handley Page, an aircraft company
 Hindustan Petroleum
 America West Airlines (1981-2006), an American airline (IATA code HP)
 Amapola Flyg (2004-present), a Swedish airline (IATA code HP)
 HP Books, an imprint of the Penguin Group

Media, music, and entertainment
 Harry Potter, a novel series by J.K. Rowling
 Hello Project, a J-pop idol brand under Japanese music company Up-Front Group
 Horse-Power: Ballet Symphony, a 1932 ballet composed by Carlos Chávez
 Hot Package, a TV show created by Adult Swim

Places
 Harrison Plaza, a shopping mall in the Philippines that closed down in 2019
 Heart Peaks, a volcano in Canada
 Himachal Pradesh, a state in India
 HP postcode area, UK

Science and technology
 Haptoglobin, a protein
 Hypersensitivity pneumonitis, a respiratory inflammation
 Ilford HP photographic film prefix
 High precipitation supercell, a thunderstorm classification
 Horizontal pitch unit, 0.2 inches, used to specify rack-mounted equipment width
 Horsepower, a unit of power
 H/P, hacking/phreaking
 Heat pump, a machine that transfers thermal energy between spaces

Other uses
 Half-pay, former UK pay for military personnel not on active service
 Haltepunkt, German for railway halt
 Harry Pearson (audio critic) (1937–2014), American audio critic
 Hire purchase
 Hit points or health points in video games
 Howiesons Poort, a stone-age technology period in Africa

See also
 HP Garage, museum of Hewlett-Packard's history